Sushil Kapoor (born 23 January 1939) is an Indian former cricketer. He played first-class cricket for several teams, including Bengal and Jharkhand.

See also
 List of Bengal cricketers

References

External links
 

1939 births
Living people
Indian cricketers
Bengal cricketers
Eastern Punjab cricketers
Jharkhand cricketers
Northern Punjab cricketers
Place of birth missing (living people)